The 2009 Triglav Trophy was held between April 1 and 4, 2009. It was an international figure skating competition held annually in Jesenice, Slovenia. Skaters competed in the disciplines of men's and ladies' singles across the levels of senior, junior, and novice.

Senior results

Men

Ladies

Junior results

Men

Ladies

Novice results

Boys

Girls

External links
 2009 Triglav Trophy results (Archived)

Triglav Trophy, 2009
Triglav Trophy